The Long Tomorrow may refer to:

The Long Tomorrow (novel), a 1955 science fiction novel by Leigh Brackett
The Long Tomorrow (comics),  a 1976 science fiction comic written by Dan O'Bannon and illustrated by Moebius